Edvin-Eduardo Vásquez (born 16 October 1969) is a Guatemalan wrestler. He competed in two events at the 1988 Summer Olympics.

References

1969 births
Living people
Guatemalan male sport wrestlers
Olympic wrestlers of Guatemala
Wrestlers at the 1988 Summer Olympics
Place of birth missing (living people)